Konkol is a surname. It is derived from Polish kąkol ("corncockle"). Notable people with the surname include:

Eric Konkol (born 1976), American college basketball coach
Mark Konkol (born 1973), American writer

References

See also
 

Polish-language surnames